Rolf Steininger (August 2, 1942, Plettenberg) is a German historian and former university professor for contemporary history.

Steininger studied English language and literature and history at the universities of Marburg, Göttingen, Munich, Lancaster and Cardiff. He received a doctor's degree in 1971 and habilitated at Leibniz University Hannover in 1976. In 1980, he became a professor in Hannover. In 1983 he was appointed to a professorship at the University of Innsbruck.

From 1984, Steininger has led the Institute for Contemporary History in Innsbruck. His work concentrates in particular on the history of Post-War Germany, Austria and South Tyrol.

From 1995, Steininger has held a Jean Monnet chair, and is Senior Fellow of the Eisenhower Center for American Studies at the University of New Orleans and member of the executive committee of the European Community Studies Association. He was visiting professor at the universities of Hanoi, Saigon and Cape Town.

External links
 
 Website of Rolf Steininger
 Website of the Institute for Contemporary History in Innsbruck

20th-century German historians
Contemporary historians
1942 births
Living people
German male non-fiction writers
21st-century German historians
Academic staff of the University of Innsbruck
University of New Orleans faculty